S42 may refer to:

Aviation 
 Blériot-SPAD S.42, a French biplane trainer aircraft
 Sikorsky S-42, an American flying boat 
 Springer Municipal Airport, in Colfax County, New Mexico, United States

Rail and transit 
 S42 (Berlin), a line of the Berlin S-Bah
 S42 (Long Island bus)
 S42 (New York City bus), serving Staten Island

Science 
 S-42 (geodetic datum), used in Eastern Europe
 S42: During fumigation/spraying wear suitable respiratory equipment (appropriate wording to be specified by the manufacturer), a safety phrase
 Sulfur-42, an isotope of sulfur

Submarines 
 , of the Argentine Navy
 , of the Royal Navy
 , of the Indian Navy
 , a submarine of the United States Navy

Other uses
 IBM NetVista S42, a personal computer
 Siemens S42, a mobile phone
 Zulu language
 S42, a postcode district in Chesterfield, England